Turn It On is the third studio album by Australian singer songwriter Russell Morris and second on label Wizard Records/RCA and was released in August 1976.
The album was released in the United States of America under the title 2.

Track listing

Credits
 Bass – Anthony Jackson
 Composed By – Russell Morris
 Drums – Rick Marotta, Steve Gadd
 Guitar – Gene Barkin, Hugh McCracken, Russell Morris
 Keyboards – Roy Bitten
 Percussion – Ralph McDonald
 Synthesizer – Jean-Yves Labat

References

External links
 Turn It On by Russell Morris at Discogs

Russell Morris albums
1976 albums
RCA Records albums